The Scout is a copy of sculptor R. Tait McKenzie's The Ideal Scout, installed outside the offices of Boy Scouts of America's Columbia Pacific Council, at 2145 Southwest Front Street, in Portland, Oregon.

Description
According to the Smithsonian Institution, the statue is a "Full-length figure of an adolescent boy in the traditional Boy Scout uniform of shirt, scarf, shorts, knee socks and laced ankle-high shoes. He holds a hat over his chest with his proper right hand." The metal statue measures appropriately 70 x 26 x 19 inches, and rests on a trapezoid-shaped base with a width of approximately 52 inches and a diameter of approximately 55 inches.

History
The Portland cast was gifted by the council's former president, Zenon C.R. Hansen, and dedicated in 1972. It was surveyed as part of Smithsonian's "Save Outdoor Sculpture!" program in 1993.

See also
 1972 in art
 List of Scouting memorials
 Scouting in Oregon

References

External links
 

1972 establishments in Oregon
Boy Scouts of America
Metal sculptures
Monuments and memorials in Portland, Oregon
Outdoor sculptures in Portland, Oregon
Scouting monuments and memorials
Sculptures of children in Oregon
Southwest Portland, Oregon
Statues in Portland, Oregon